Ruská Kajňa ( is a village and municipality in Humenné District in the Prešov Region of north-east Slovakia.

Geography
The municipality lies at an altitude of 223 metres and covers an area of 5.11 km².
It has a population of about 130 people.

References

External links
 
 http://www.statistics.sk/mosmis/eng/run.html
 http://ruska-kajna.webnode.sk/

Villages and municipalities in Humenné District
Populated places established in 1582